Al-Balqa Applied University (BAU) (Arabic جامعة البلقاء التطبيقية) is a government-supported university located in Salt, Jordan, was founded in 1997, a distinctive state university in the field of Bachelor and associate degree Applied Education, at the capacity of more than 21,000 student distributed into 10,000 at the bachelor's degree program and 11,000 at the associate degree program.

Balqa' Applied University was formed by merging several colleges distributed over almost all of the Jordanian provinces. The merger was the result of royal decree, under the auspices of his majesty the late King Hussein to provide qualified professionals who focus on applied technical studies.
A recent stadium was constructed to hold official graduation and ceremonies and was finished in 2011.

BAU is ranked 5th  on national level, and has achieved an international ranking of 2575 and a regional ranking of 55 according to the Webometrics Ranking of World Universities ranking, as well as a regional ranking of 79 according to US News Education

Faculties 
BAU has 18 branches divided into 6 faculties at the main campus in Al-Salt, and 12 faculties around the kingdom. BAU has a faculty in every Jordanian governorate (Except for Mafraq).

In addition to its responsibilities as a hub for higher education, BAU administers a total of 38 public, private and military community colleges across the kingdom.

Faculties in main campus in Al-Salt

Faculty of Medicine

 Doctor of Medicine

Faculty of Engineering

 Architecture
 Civil Engineering
 Computer Engineering
 Computer Systems Engineering
 Electrical Power Engineering 
 Mechanical Engineering 
 Materials Engineering
 Surveying & Geomatics Engineering

Prince Abdullah Bin Ghazi faculty for Information Technology 

 Computer Science                                
 Computer Aided Design & Animation
 Software Engineering
 Computer Information Systems

Faculty of Applied Science

 Mathematics                                        
 Chemistry 
 Physics                                    
 Medical Analyses
 Applied Microbiology
 Nutrition and Food Processing

Salt College for Humanitarian And Literary Sciences

BsC programmes:

 Law
 Nursery Education (females only)
 English Language and Literature
 Library and Information Management
 Applied Arabic Language 

Technical diploma programmes:
 Interior Design
Diploma degree:
 Digital Graphic Design
Vocational Diploma programmes:

 Digital Graphic Design            
 School Administration                     
 Education                                  
 Information & Telecommunication Technology in Education

Faculty of Planning and Management

 Economics                   
 Planning and Project Management 
 Banking and Finances 
 Business Management
 Accounting Information Systems
 Management Information Systems
 Marketing
 Accounting

Faculty of Technological Agriculture

 Biotechnology 
 Nutrition and Food Processing
 Bioagricultural Technology / Plant Production and Protection 
 Water Resources and Environmental Management

Faculty of Graduate Studies

The faculty of graduate studies offers the master's degree in the following topics:

 Computer Science 
 Nuclear Physics  
 Physics of Materials Science 
 Management of water resources and the environment
 Applied Chemistry  
 Biotechnology
 Mechatronics Engineering
 Business Administration: MIS
 Business Management   
 Project Management
 Human Resources Management    
 Business Administration: Accounting
 Talent and creativity
 Educational Psychology
 Regional Planning  
 Business Administration: E-Business

Other faculties around Al-Salt

Princess Rahma University College

Located in the town of Allan, north west of Salt, PRUC offers the following programmes:BsC:
 Social Work 
 Delinquency and Crime 
 Special Education

Diploma:
 Social Work 
 Special Education

Faculties in Northern Jordan

Al-Huson University College

Located in Irbid, it offers the following programmes:
BsC:

 Computer Science
 Nutrition & Food Processing
 Chemical Industrial Engineering
 Accounting                            
 Management of Information Systems
 Water & Environment Engineering
 Vocational Education     
 Machinery & Production Engineering
 Air Conditioning & Refrigeration engineering  
 Human Resources Management 
 Communication & Software Engineering 

Master's
 Desalination Engineering

Ajloun University College

Located in Ajloun, AUC offers the following programmes:

 Computer Science 
 English Language and Literature 
 Nursery Education (Females only)
 Social Services                   
 Arabic Language and Literature
 Special Education
 Applied Islamic Studies    
 Mathematics         
 Delinquency and Crime

Irbid University College

IUC is a females-only college. It is located in Irbid, IUC offers the following programmes:

 English language & literature 
 Applied Arabic Language   
 Library & Information Management
 Business Management                
 Nursery Education
 Home Economics
 Pottery and Art

Faculties in Central Jordan

Princess Alia University College

PAUC is a females-only college. It's located in the Shmeisani neighbourhood in West Amman, it offers the following programmes:

 English language & literature 
 Applied Arabic Language  
 Library & Information Management
 Business Management                
 Nursery Education
 Home Economics
 Business Administration
 Psychological and Educational Guidance
 Special Education

Amman University College for Financial & Administrative Sciences

Located in Jabal Al-Hussein, Amman. It offers the following programmes:

 Accounting                          
 Financial and Banking Sciences 
 Management of Information Systems
 Business Administration
 Accounting Information Systems

Zarqa University College

Located in Zarqa, it offers the following programmes:
                       
 Nutrition and Food Processing
 Medical Analyses
 Biology
 Applied Microbiology

Faculty of Engineering Technology (FET)

Located in Al Zahra neighbourhood in Marka, East Amman. FET is specialized in engineering and technological programmes. It currently offers the following programmes:

 Chemical Industrial Engineering 
 Electric Power Engineering  
 Highway and Bridge Engineering
 Mechatronics Engineering                
 Computer Engineering 
 Thermal & Hydraulic Machinery Engineering
 Autotronics Engineering  
 Telecommunication Engineering
 General Mechanical Engineering 
 Networks Engineering
 Physics

Faculties in Southern Jordan

Aqaba University College

Located in Aqaba.

 Hotel Management                
 Management of Information Systems        
 Accounting
 Computer Science
 Maritime Transport Technology            
 Freight Forwarding and Logistics

Karak College
 
Located in Kerak.

 Library and Information Management 
 Management of Information Systems 
 Accounting Information Systems

Ma’an College

Located in Ma'an.

 Accounting                                      
 Management of Information Systems  
 Accounting Information Systems
 Banking and Financial Sciences

Shobak College

Located in the town of Shoubak, near by Petra.
 Plant Production and Protection                                    
 Vocational Education

Affiliated Institutes
 The Royal Jordanian Geographic Center College (Amman).

Former Faculties
 Tafilah Applied University College: Became Tafila Technical University in Tafilah in 2005.
 Usul Al-Deen University College: Became World Islamic Sciences and Education University in Tabarbour, northern Amman.

References 

 
Educational institutions established in 1997
1997 establishments in Jordan